is a Japanese football player. He plays for Renofa Yamaguchi FC.

Career
Masakazu Yoshioka joined J2 League club V-Varen Nagasaki in 2017.

References

External links

1995 births
Living people
Komazawa University alumni
Association football people from Nagasaki Prefecture
Japanese footballers
J1 League players
J2 League players
J3 League players
V-Varen Nagasaki players
Kataller Toyama players
Avispa Fukuoka players
Renofa Yamaguchi FC players
Association football midfielders